Charoen is a Thai word meaning "prosper". As a given name, it may refer to:

Charoen Khanthawong (1933–2022), Thai Minister of Science and Technology
Charoen Sirivadhanabhakdi  (born  1944),  Thai entrepreneur
Charoen Suepsaeng (1902–1969), Thai politician
Charoen Wattanasin (born 1937), former badminton player from Thailand

See also